Breaking Point! is an album by trumpeter Freddie Hubbard, recorded on May 7, 1964, and released on the Blue Note label. Although it features performances by Hubbard's recent collaborators Ronnie Mathews and Eddie Khan, it was a departure in style from his work with Mathews and the Jazz Messengers.

Reception
Michael G. Nastos of AllMusic commented "The pure energy Hubbard injected into this ensemble, and the sheer originality of this music beyond peers like Miles Davis and Lee Morgan, identified Hubbard as the newest of new voices on his instrument. Breaking Point has stood the test of time as a recording far ahead of mid-'60s post-bop, and is an essential item for all listeners of incendiary progressive jazz". Chris Slawecki in his review for Encyclopedia of Music in the 20th Century called the album "a crackling mixture of free atonality, beautiful melody and blues feeling."

Track listing
All compositions by Freddie Hubbard except as noted
 "Breaking Point" - 10:19
 "Far Away" - 10:58
 "Blue Frenzy" - 6:23
 "D Minor Mint" - 6:24
 "Mirrors" (Chambers) - 6:08
 "Blue Frenzy" [Alternate take] - 3:18 Bonus track on CD
 "Mirrors" [Alternate take] - 3:23 Bonus track on CD

Personnel
 Freddie Hubbard - trumpet
 James Spaulding - alto saxophone, flute
 Ronnie Mathews - piano
 Eddie Khan - bass
 Joe Chambers - drums

Charts

References

1964 albums
Freddie Hubbard albums
Blue Note Records albums
Albums produced by Alfred Lion
Albums recorded at Van Gelder Studio